Country Roads & Other Places is an album by vibraphonist Gary Burton recorded in 1968 and released in 1969 on the RCA Victor label. Burton doubles on piano with a quartet of guitarist Jerry Hahn, bassist Steve Swallow and drummer Roy Haynes.

Reception 
The Allmusic review by Scott Yanow awarded the album 4 stars, stating, "In addition to both melodic and advanced jazz, Burton incorporates elements of country, rock, pop and even classical music on this fairly rare LP... the music is full of logical surprises that foreshadow the eclectic nature of much of '80s and '90s jazz".

Track listing
 "Country Roads" (Gary Burton, Steve Swallow) - 5:06 
 "The Green Mountains" (Swallow) - 3:41 
 "True or False" (Swallow) - 1:45 
 "Gone, But Forgotten" (Burton, Mike Gibbs) - 3:45 
 "Ravel Prelude (Le tombeau de Couperin: Prelude)" (Maurice Ravel) - 3:14 
 "And on the Third Day" (Gibbs) - 4:06 
 "A Singing Song" (Burton) - 2:46 
 "Wichita Breakdown" (Burton, Jerry Hahn) - 2:43 
 "My Foolish Heart" (Ned Washington, Victor Young) - 2:30 
 "A Family Joy" (Gibbs) - 4:45 
Recorded at RCA's Studio B in New York City.

Personnel 
 Gary Burton — vibraphone, piano
 Jerry Hahn — guitar (tracks 1-4 and 6-10)
 Steve Swallow — bass (tracks 1-4 and 6-10) 
 Roy Haynes — drums (tracks 1-4 and 6-10)

References

RCA Records albums
Gary Burton albums
1969 albums